Breakneck Pond is a  lake surrounded by the Nipmuck State Forest in Union, Connecticut.  A small portion of the lake extends into Sturbridge, Massachusetts.  The maximum depth of the lake is 12'.  The entire lake shore is undeveloped and motorized vehicles and boats are prohibited.  The lake is accessible through trails from Bigelow Hollow State Park and camping is permitted at three locations around the lake.  It is also the northern terminus for the Nipmuck Trail.

References

External links
 CT Bigelow Hollow State Park Web Site 
 CT Fish Finder report 

Lakes of Connecticut
Lakes of Tolland County, Connecticut
Union, Connecticut
Nipmuck State Forest